Samuel Louis Gilmore (July 30, 1859 – July 18, 1910) was a U.S. Representative from Louisiana.

Gilmore was born in New Orleans, Louisiana. He was instructed by private tutors, graduating from the Central High School of New Orleans in 1874, from Seton Hall College, South Orange, New Jersey, in 1877, and from the law department of the University of Louisiana (now Tulane University) at New Orleans in 1879. He was admitted to the bar in 1880 and commenced practice in New Orleans, Louisiana. From 1888 to 1896, Gilmore served as assistant city attorney. He was city attorney from 1896 until March 15, 1909, when he resigned. He served as delegate to the Democratic National Convention in 1908.

Gilmore was elected as a Democrat to the Sixty-first Congress to fill the vacancy caused by the death of Robert C. Davey and served from March 30, 1909, until his death in Abita Springs, Louisiana, on July 18, 1910. He was interred in Metairie Cemetery, New Orleans, Louisiana.

His daughter, Martha Gilmore Robinson, was a women's rights and civic activist. His son, Samuel	Louis	Gilmore, Jr., was a poet and playwright, 	as well	as an associate	editor for The Double Dealer.

See also
List of United States Congress members who died in office (1900–49)

References

Samuel Louis Gilmore, late a representative from Louisiana, Memorial addresses delivered in the House of Representatives and Senate frontispiece 1911

1859 births
1910 deaths
Seton Hall University alumni
Tulane University Law School alumni
Democratic Party members of the United States House of Representatives from Louisiana
19th-century American politicians